Northfields may refer to:

 Northfields, Leicester
 Northfields, London

See also 

 Northfield (disambiguation)